Roman Viktorovich Shapkin (born 27 May 1971) is a Russian professional football coach and a former player.

Club career
He played 7 seasons in the Russian Football National League for FC Spartak-Orekhovo Orekhovo-Zuyevo and FC Dynamo Bryansk.

References

1971 births
People from Orekhovo-Zuyevo
Living people
Soviet footballers
Russian footballers
Association football defenders
FC Torpedo Moscow players
FC Saturn Ramenskoye players
FC Dynamo Bryansk players
Russian football managers
FC Znamya Truda Orekhovo-Zuyevo players
Sportspeople from Moscow Oblast